Ileana Ydolia Garcia is a Republican politician from Florida, who serves as a member of the Florida Senate.

Early life
The daughter of Cuban exiles, Garcia grew up in Florida. Her career was in media, working in both television and radio.

Political career
She served as the first Hispanic female Deputy Press Secretary at the Department of Homeland Security under President Donald Trump. Garcia founded the group Latinas for Trump and in 2016 was the Trump campaign's communications Director for Latino outreach.

In March 2022 during debate for the Parental Rights in Education bill in the Florida Senate, Ileana Garcia claimed that “gay is not a permanent thing, LGBT is not a permanent thing.”

2020 Florida Senate election fraud investigation
In June 2020, Garcia filed to run against incumbent Democrat José Javier Rodríguez in Florida's 37th State Senate District. On the first count, Garcia beat Rodríguez by a narrow margin of 31 votes; the lead increased to 34 after a recount.

Garcia's election then came under immediate scrutiny by local news outlets for the candidacy of independent candidate Alex Rodríguez, who shares the same last name as José Javier Rodríguez and is an acquaintance of former Republican State Senator Frank Artiles. Alex Rodríguez did not campaign but received 6,382 votes from voters confused about who they were voting for. It was widely acknowledged that his candidacy was decisive in the outcome of the election.

On March 17, 2021, Artiles was accused of having paid $44,708.03 to Alex Rodríguez before and after the election in order for him to run as a false candidate in order to siphon off votes from candidate José Javier Rodríguez. His house at Palmetto Bay was searched, and he surrendered the next day to the Miami-Dade County Jail.

References

External links

Republican Party Florida state senators
Living people
American politicians of Cuban descent
21st-century American politicians
Year of birth missing (living people)
21st-century American women politicians
Women state legislators in Florida
Hispanic and Latino American state legislators in Florida
Latino conservatism in the United States